Addison Airport  is a public airport in Addison, in Dallas County, Texas, United States,  north of downtown Dallas. It opened in 1954 and was purchased by the town of Addison in 1976. It is home to the Cavanaugh Flight Museum.

The Addison Airport Toll Tunnel, completed in 1999, allows east–west automobile traffic to cross the airport under the runway.

Facilities and aircraft
In 2015 it had 96,476 aircraft operations, averaging 264 per day: 93% general aviation, 7% air taxi, <1% airline and <1% military. 621 aircraft were then based at the airport: 323 single-engine, 111 multi-engine, 176 jet and 11 helicopter. In 2022, its runway designation was changed from 15/33 to 16/34.

The currently fixed-base operators at Addison airport are Atlantic Aviation, Landmark Aviation, Million Air and Galaxy.

Charter services are available from a variety of companies, with Business Jet Solutions and Bombardier FlexJet having large operations.

The airport is the headquarters of Ameristar Jet Charter, GTA Air, and Martinaire, and also has scheduled freight flights from AirNet Express, Flight Express, and Flight Development.

It is also a training hub, with primary to advanced flight instruction available from Thrust Flight School, American Flyers, ATP Flight School, Monarch Air and PlaneSmart!.

Airlines and destinations

Cargo

Accidents and incidents

July 19, 1986: All four occupants of a Cessna 421, aircraft registration N6VR, were killed when the aircraft suffered an apparent right-hand engine failure, rolled over, and dived into a vacant lot immediately after takeoff from Addison Airport. The post-crash investigation revealed that the right-hand engine did not show any obvious signs of failure and its controls were not set to deliver full takeoff power. The crash was attributed to incorrect engine control operation; the pilot had recently purchased the Cessna 421 but had not been formally trained to fly it, and most of his twin-engined experience had been in an airplane with engine controls that operated in the reverse direction of those in the Cessna.
June 20, 1992: The pilot of a Piper J3C-65 Cub, registered N3128M, reported trouble and attempted to return to Addison Airport soon after taking off to test a newly installed engine. While turning to line up with the runway, the airplane suddenly lost altitude, rolled upside down, and crashed in the middle of nearby Beltway Drive, killing the pilot and his passenger. The crash was attributed to breakage of the left-hand elevator control tube due to corrosion.
January 1, 2004: The pilot and passenger of a Bellanca 17-30A Super Viking, registered N4104B, died when the aircraft struck houses in the Preston Hollow neighborhood of nearby Dallas, Texas, after departing from Addison Airport bound for Amarillo, Texas. An intense post-crash fire destroyed two houses and the remains of the Bellanca, but an elderly resident of one house escaped injury after being dragged out of the burning structure by his caregiver, who was also unhurt. The crash was attributed to spatial disorientation in densely clouded IFR conditions; the pilot had reported a partial instrument panel failure, after which radar data indicated that he was making left turns instead of right turns as directed by air traffic controllers.
October 24, 2011: A Cirrus SR22, registered N227TX, attempted to return to Addison Airport shortly after takeoff. After several missed approaches, the aircraft crashed on a railroad track next to Hebron High School, killing one passenger and seriously injuring the pilot and a second passenger. The accident was attributed to "the pilot's failure to adequately preflight the airplane prior to departure, which resulted in a loss of engine power due to fuel exhaustion."

June 30, 2019: A Beechcraft King Air 350i, registered N534FF, crashed into a hangar on airport grounds after taking off for a flight to St. Petersburg, Florida, killing all eight passengers and two pilots on board. The hangar was unoccupied at the time of the crash and nobody on the ground was harmed. The aircraft reportedly dropped its left wing on takeoff and immediately veered to the left. The Federal Aviation Administration and the National Transportation Safety Board investigated. The investigation determined an engine failure was followed by the pilot moving the rudder the wrong way, causing the aircraft to roll over and crash.

References

External links

Addison Airport, official site

Cavanaugh Flight Museum
Addison Fire Department
DFW Instrument Corporation

Airports in the Dallas–Fort Worth metroplex
Defunct motorsport venues in the United States
Buildings and structures in Dallas County, Texas
Transportation in Dallas County, Texas
Airports established in 1954
Airports in Texas
Addison, Texas